Rory P. MacCabe is an Irish judge who is a judge of the High Court since January 2022 and is the chairperson of the Garda Síochána Ombudsman Commission. He was a judge of the Circuit Court between 2007 and 2022 and was formerly a barrister and civil servant.

Early career 
MacCabe first worked in the Irish civil service. He holds a diploma in public administration. He was called to the Bar in 1984 and became a senior counsel in 1999. He was involved in criminal trials and also acted in civil matters including employment law, defamation, personal injuries and injunctions. He acted for the builder Tom Brennan at the Mahon Tribunal.

David Andrews, as Minister for Foreign Affairs, employed MacCabe from 1998 to advise him on European affairs.

He was appointed to the Refugee Appeals Tribunal in August 2001.

Judicial career

Circuit Court 
He was appointed to the Circuit Court in May 2007. He was not assigned to a particular circuit. He presided over criminal trials involving drugs offences, robbery, sexual offences, assault, fraud, harassment, arson, and theft. He was presiding judge in cases involving debt recovery, defamation and health and safety law.

He was a member of the Sentencing Guidelines and Information Committee of the Judicial Council of Ireland and he was the chair of the Judicial ICT Cross Jurisdictional Committee.

He chaired a steering group of the Irish Sports Council in 2008.

High Court and GSOC 
MacCabe was nominated to replace Mary Ellen Ring as the chairperson of the Garda Síochána Ombudsman Commission in December 2021. To facilitate his appointment, he was appointed to the High Court in January 2022. He also became the GSOC chairperson in January 2022.

References

Living people
Year of birth missing (living people)
Circuit Court (Ireland) judges
High Court judges (Ireland)
Alumni of King's Inns
21st-century Irish judges